A Room for Romeo Brass is a 1999 British teen comedy-drama film directed by Shane Meadows, who also co-wrote the film with Paul Fraser. The film was mainly shot in Calverton, Nottinghamshire between 5 September and 17 October 1998. The location of the seaside scene was Chapel St. Leonards in Lincolnshire.

The film stars Andrew Shim as Romeo Brass, Ben Marshall as Gavin Woolley and Paddy Considine as Morell. It marked the screen debut of Vicky McClure and Considine, the latter of whom went on to star in Meadows' 2004 film, Dead Man's Shoes. It was nominated in three categories at the 1999 British Independent Film Awards.

Plot
12-year-old boys Romeo Brass and Gavin Woolley have been best friends and neighbours for most of their lives. Gavin suffers from a back injury which causes him to be bullied by other boys, while Romeo is quick to step in and defend him. One day Gavin is confronted by two boys, Romeo intervenes and things turn violent. Gavin's injury prevents him from assisting his friend.

During the fight Gavin spots Morell, who is a few years older, and calls to him for help. Morell chases the two boys off and then drives Romeo and Gavin back home. Romeo's family notice that Morell's behaviour is a little unusual. Morell develops an immediate attraction toward Romeo's sister Ladine and seeks Romeo's advice about asking her out. Gavin plays a prank on Morell which results in him humiliating himself. Morell goes to the shop where Ladine works to apologise and ask her out again; she accepts out of pity.

The next day, Morell encourages the boys to miss school and accompany him to the beach. When Romeo goes to buy ice cream, Morell confronts Gavin about the prank that he pulled and viciously threatens him with what will happen if he ever tries to do it again.

Romeo continues spending time with Morell while Gavin goes into hospital for an operation, which results in Gavin distancing himself from both of them. Romeo looks up to Morell as a new father-figure after he is infuriated by his estranged and violent father Joe coming back into his old life.

Morell encourages Romeo to behave more violently and convinces him to stay away from Gavin, whilst continuing to pursue Ladine who is disturbed by his eccentric behaviour. Ladine is in Morell's flat when he makes a pass at her which she rebuffs. Feeling rejected, Morell is angry and tries to persuade Ladine to least fool around with him sexually, but she storms out of the flat. The next day, Romeo goes inside Morell's flat before Morell takes his frustrations out on Romeo, bullying him and ejecting him from his flat.

The next day, Morell forces Romeo into his van in order to follow Ladine. In front of Romeo, Morell viciously attacked a customer whom Ladine was flirting with, which causes Romeo to run away. Upset by Morell's actions, Romeo goes to Gavin's house where he is comforted by Gavin's parents. Morell follows Romeo back to Gavin's house and starts to bully Gavin's dad Bill. Witnessing this, Romeo's father Joe steps in to defend Bill, attacking Morell, and forcing him away. Romeo and Gavin reconcile their friendship and restore some semblance of normality back into their lives.

Cast
 Andrew Shim as Romeo Brass
 Ben Marshall as Gavin "Knocks" Woolley
 Paddy Considine as Morell
 Vicky McClure as Ladine Brass
 Ladene Hall as Carol Brass
 Frank Harper as Joe Brass
 Julia Ford as Sandra Woolley
 James Higgins as Bill Woolley
 Bob Hoskins as Steven Laws
 Shane Meadows (credited as Shaun Fields) as Male Nurse / Fish and Chip Shop Man

Soundtrack
 "A Message to You Rudy", written by Dandy Livingstone, performed by The Specials
 "O Maria", written and performed by Beck
 "Dead Melodies", written and performed by Beck
 "Corpses in Their Mouths", written by Ian Brown, Aziz Ibrahim, performed by Ian Brown
 "Jesus Walking", written and performed by Nick Hemming as The Leisure Society
 "Matty Groves", traditional arranged by Sandy Denny, Ashley Hutchings, Richard Thompson, Dave Mattacks, Simon Nicol, Dave Swarbrick, performed by Fairport Convention
 "Twenty-Five Miles", written by Edwin Starr, Johnny Bristol, Harvey Fuqua, Jerry Ragovoy, Bert Berns, performed by Edwin Starr
 "Move It On Over", written and performed by Hank Williams
 "Stolen Car (Beth Orton song)", written by Beth Orton, Sean Read, performed by Beth Orton
 "John Lee", written by Dave Swarbrick, performed by Fairport Convention
 "Everything's Gonna Be Alright", written by Andrew Loog Oldham, Dave Skinner, performed by P.P. Arnold
 "Don't Forget Your Shovel", written by Christie Hennessy, performed by Christy Moore
 "Civvy Street Fiasco", written by Stephen Lawrie, performed by Unisex
 "Fox in the Snow", written and performed by Belle & Sebastian
 "5,6,7,8", written by Steve Crosby, Barry Upton, performed by Steps
 "Colours", written and performed by Donovan
 "Listen Here", written and performed by Eddie Harris
 "If This Is Love", written by Gavin Clarke, performed by Sunhouse
 "Going Down", written by Ian Brown, John Squire, performed by The Stone Roses
 "After Midnight", written and performed by JJ Cale
 "Everywhere", written by Greg Trooper, Ed Griffin, performed by Billy Bragg

Reception
On Rotten Tomatoes the film has an approval rating of 68% based on reviews from 25 critics.

Awards
 1999 British Independent Film Awards (nominated)
 Best British Film
 Best Director (Shane Meadows)
 Best Original Screenplay (Shane Meadows and Paul Fraser)

References

External links
 

1999 films
1999 comedy-drama films
1990s coming-of-age comedy-drama films
1990s teen comedy-drama films
British coming-of-age comedy-drama films
Black British films
British teen comedy-drama films
Films about domestic violence
Films directed by Shane Meadows
Films set in 1999
Films set in Nottingham
1990s English-language films
1990s British films